Lailapas Football Club (transliterated Athlitikos Podosfairikos Syllogos Lailapas), is a Greek football club based in Chios, Greece currently competing in the Fourth Division of Greek football. The team play their home matches at the Fafalion Stadium in Vrontados.

History 

Having originally been founded as Λαίλαψ in 1925, F.C. Lailapas is one of Greece's oldest and formerly most competitive clubs. Its period of greatest success came in the 1920s, 1930s and 1940s during which it won an impressive number of titles. In December 1930, Lailapas hosted the then champion of Izmir, Karşıyaka S.K. in a match of great historical significance, given the state of Greco-Turkish relations over the previous decade. Due to bad weather however, the match was abandoned shortly after kick-off. It was widely heralded as the first meeting between Greek and Turkish football teams, competitive or otherwise in the wake of the Greco-Turkish War of 1919-1922.

In the post-war period, Lailapas experienced a period of decline and was eventually forced to close down following financial difficulties in the mid-1950s. The club has since been re-founded on two occasions, most recently in 2009.

References

External links 
 Ένωση Ποδοσφαιρικών Σωματείων Χίου 

Football clubs in North Aegean
Chios